Of Your Son is the 1998 second album of the Canadian artist Bruce Guthro. The album produced the singles Walk This Road, Falling,  Ivey's Wall, Two Story House, Good Love and Love Lives On. The album is credited for launching Guthro into the mainstream music scene.

Track listing
 "Falling" – 4:13
 "Hobo Train" – 4:46
 "Ivey's Wall" – 4:45
 "Little Gifts" – 2:55
 "Dirty Money" – 4:07
 "Fallen Angel" – 4:22
 "Walk This Road" – 3:21
 "Love Lives On" – 3:13
 "Two Story House" (with Amy Sky) – 4:39
 "Forbidden" – 5:18
 "Friends" – 3:41
 "Good Love" – 3:29
 "Falling (original version)" – 6:43

Chart performance

1998 albums
Bruce Guthro albums
EMI Records albums